Massimiliano Rota (born 6 June 1970) is an Italian bobsledder. He competed at the 1998 Winter Olympics and the 2002 Winter Olympics.

References

External links
 

1970 births
Living people
Italian male bobsledders
Olympic bobsledders of Italy
Bobsledders at the 1998 Winter Olympics
Bobsledders at the 2002 Winter Olympics
People from Terni
Sportspeople from the Province of Terni